Every Day's a Holiday  is a 1965 British musical comedy film directed by James Hill and starring John Leyton, Mike Sarne, Ron Moody, Grazina Frame, and Freddie and the Dreamers. Its plot involves a group of teenagers who take up jobs working in a seaside resort for the summer. It was released in the U.S. as Seaside Swingers.

It was filmed in and around Butlin's Clacton at Clacton-on-Sea.

Cast
 John Leyton ...  Gerry Pullman
 Mike Sarne ...  The Hon. Timothy Gilpin
 Freddie and the Dreamers ...  The Chefs
 Freddie Garrity ...  Chef Freddie (as Freddie and the Dreamers)
 Derek Quinn ...  Chef Danny (as Freddie and the Dreamers)
 Roy Crewdson ...  Chef Gustav (as Freddie and the Dreamers)
 Pete Birrell ...  Chef Sigmund (as Freddie and the Dreamers)
 Bernie Dwyer ...  Chef Henri (as Freddie and the Dreamers)
 Ron Moody ...  Glen Basto
 Liz Fraser ...  Miss Slightly
 Grazina Frame ...  Christina Barrington de Witt
 Nicholas Parsons ...  Julian Goddard
 Michael Ripper ...  Ernest Pulman
 Hazel Hughes ...  Mrs. Barrington de Witt
 Richard O'Sullivan ...  Jimmy Dainty
 Tony Daines ...  Mike
 Susan Baker ... Twin 1
 Jennifer Baker ... Twin 2
 Peter Gilmore ...  Kenneth
 Charles Lloyd-Pack ...  Mr. Close
 Patrick Newell ...  Mr. Hoskins
 Gaby Vargas ...  Anne
 Nicola Riley ...  Little Girl
 Marion Grimaldi ...  Television Vision Mixer
 Coral Morphew ...  Serena
 The Mojos  ...Themselves

Music
 Freddie & The Dreamers ... What's Cooking
 John Leyton & Mike Sarne & Grazina Frame ... Every Day's A Holiday
 John Leyton ... All I Want Is You
 Mike Sarne ... Love Me Please
 John Leyton & Grazina Frame ... A Boy Needs A Girl
 Freddie & The Dreamers ... Don't Do That To Me
 John Leyton & Mike Sarne & Grazina Frame & Susan Baker & Jennifer Baker & Richard O'Sullivan & Tony Daines ... Say You Do
 Mike Sarne ... Indubitably Me
 Grazina Frame ... Second Time Shy
 John Leyton ... Crazy Horse Saloon
 The Mojos  ... Everything's Alright

References

External links

1965 films
British musical comedy films
1960s English-language films
Films directed by James Hill (British director)
1965 musical comedy films
1960s British films